BrassNeck Theatre is a theatre company based in Leeds, West Yorkshire, England. It was formed by the merger of The Grove & Rawdon Theatre Company and Stampede Theatre Company in January 2010.

BrassNeck Theatre's first production was Footloose the Musical, performed at Yeadon Town Hall in May 2010. The majority of the company's productions, and rehearsals, take place at Yeadon Town Hall and  Guiseley Theatre.

Reputation

BrassNeck Theatre's reputation was formed in its two founding theatre companies. The Grove and Rawdon Theatre Company and Stampede Theatre Company were both well known for producing professional standard theatre, with local reviewers often comparing the standard to that of London's West End.

In recent years, BrassNeck Theatre has built on this reputation by successfully staging a wide range of plays and musical theatre, all receiving positive reviews in local media and from audiences. Reviewers often comment not only on the high quality of their acting, singing and dancing, but also on technical expertise with custom built sets and a very high standard of lighting and sound.<ref name="Whistle Down the Wind Pickled Egg Review">Pickled Egg, BrassNeck’s polished performance of Whistle Down the Wind, www.pickledegg.info, May 2013</ref>

Future shows

BrassNeck Theatre's next show will be Sunset Boulevard, with the performance due May 2020 at Yeadon Town Hall.

Previous shows

2010: Footloose the Musical, Our House2011: The Producers, Bouncers & Shakers, RENT2012: The Full Monty, Calendar Girls, Fiddler on the Roof2013: Whistle Down the Wind, Avenue Q2014: The Wedding Singer, Little Women2015: The 25th Annual Putnam County Spelling Bee, The Addams Family2016: The 39 Steps, Spamalot2017: Rock of Ages2018: Into the Woods2019: Sunset Boulevard History 

The Grove and Rawdon Theatre Company

The Grove and Rawdon Theatre Company were formed in 2002 by the merger of Horsforth Grove Amateur Operatics Society and Rawdon Amateur Operatics Society.

From 2002 to 2009, The Grove and Rawdon Theatre Company staged 16 productions, and became renowned for producing difficult musicals to a high standard. Their shows, including Jesus Christ Superstar, Seussical the Musical, Buddy! and Wizard of Oz, frequently received rave reviews in local papers.

They also gained a reputation for their willingness to tackle new and challenging musicals, such as Bat Boy, Spend Spend Spend and Jekyll and Hyde.

The Grove and Rawdon Theatre Company Productions

2002: The Music Man, Swing, Sing and Tango (Cabaret style show)
2003: South Pacific, Chicago Nights (Cabaret style show)
2004: My Fair Lady, Return to the Forbidden Planet2005: Jesus Christ Superstar, Seussical the Musical2006: Spend Spend Spend, Buddy!2007: Carousel, Bat Boy2008: Jekyll & Hyde, Boogie Nights2009: Wizard of Oz, A Funny Thing Happened on the Way to the ForumStampede Theatre Company

Stampede Theatre Company was founded in 2006, "in response to a growing need for a 'youth based' theatre company in the Wharfedale area".

The theatre company produced 9 musical shows and became well known in the local area for their quality productions, in particular the high standard of their youth members. Like The Grove and Rawdon Theatre Company, their productions earned rave reviews in local news, including their productions of the schools version of Les Miserables, We Will Rock You, and West Side Story.

Stampede Theatre Company maintained that while they had an emphasis on youth, they were not only a youth company, and staged a number of successful productions with an "adult" cast, including The Full Monty and Sweeney Todd.

Stampede Theatre Company Productions

2006: Les Miserables (Schools Version), Cabaret 2006 (Cabaret style show), Annie2007: Little Shop of Horrors, We Will Rock You2008: The Full Monty, Back to the 80's2009: Sweeney Todd, West Side StoryNotable members

Both companies involved in the BrassNeck Theatre were known for having a high standard of membership. Previous and current members have studied at leading drama schools such as GSA Conservatoire and Mountview Academy of Theatre Arts. Past and present notable members of the theatre include:

Christian Cooke – performed with Horsforth Grove Amateur Operatics Society in their youth production of Bugsy Malone. Cooke is now a professional actor, appearing in Demons and the 2010 film Cemetery Junction.
Verity Rushworth – performed with Horsforth Grove Amateur Operatics Society in their youth production of Bugsy Malone. After making her name on Emmerdale as Donna Windsor-Dingle, Rushworth performed in the London production of the hit musical Hairspray as Penny Pingleton before moving to take over the role of Maria in the UK tour of The Sound of Music.
Peter Grant – performed with Rawdon Amateur Operatics Society in their production of Oliver. Grant is now a professional singer.
Darcy Isa – performed with Stampede Theatre Company in their production of Back to the 80's. Isa is a professional actress, playing Lauren Andrews in the TV series Waterloo Road.
Megan Parkinson – performed with BrassNeck Theatre in their production of Little Women and appeared in Game of Thrones, Season 7.
Luke Bayer – performed with BrassNeck Theatre most notably in their production of RENT as Angel, as well as both founding companies. Luke appeared as alternate for Jamie in the West End production of Everybody's Talking About Jamie, winning the  award for Best Performance By An Understudy/Alternate in Any Play or Musical at the 2018 BroadwayWorld UK Awards.
Bradley Judge – performed in a number of productions with the BrassNeck Theatre founding companies, most notably with Stampede Theatre Company in their production of The Full Monty. Bradley is part of the 2019 Hair tour.
Richard Anthony-Lloyd – Richard took part in many of the founding company and BrassNeck Theatre shows, and was Chairman of both Stampede Theatre Company, and then later BrassNeck Theatre company until 2018. Richard is an understudy on the 2018/19 tour of Calendar Girls.
Katharine Pearson – performed with BrassNeck Theatre in their production of RENT as Mimi. Katherine appeared in the ensemble of the 2017/18 West End production of 42nd Street''.

References

External links 
 BrassNeck Theatre Website
 Previous Grove and Rawdon Theatre Company Website
 Previous Stampede Theatre Company Website

Amateur theatre companies in England